The Ford Model K is an upscale automobile that was produced by Ford. It was introduced in 1906 and replaced the earlier Model B. It was built at the Ford Piquette Avenue Plant. The model K was aimed at the top end of the market and featured an inline-6 (the only Ford six until 1941) giving 40 hp (30 kW).

Contrary to popular folklore, the Model K was a good seller for Ford Motor Company.  In 1906, the first year it was offered, the Model K produced over 85 percent of Ford Motor Company's new car profit (1906 Ford Motor Company internal audit records).  

In 1907, the second sales year of the Model K, almost 500 examples were sold, making it the best-selling six-cylinder model in the world.

As period journals reported, Ford Motor Company went in another direction, moving to one chassis, a mid-priced car, the Model T, leaving the multi-line business model used by most auto makers of the period.  However, sales and profits from the Model K helped Ford Motor Company become the largest automaker in number of sales in 1907, and along with the Model N, was the only Ford model sold through three model years (1906–1908) prior to the advent of the Model T.

References

 
 

Model K
Cars introduced in 1906
Brass Era vehicles
Motor vehicles manufactured in the United States